Mallare (locally) is a comune (municipality) in the Province of Savona in the Italian region Liguria, located about  southwest of Genoa and about  west of Savona.

Mallare borders the following municipalities: Altare, Bormida, Calice Ligure, Carcare, Orco Feglino, Pallare, and Quiliano.

References

Cities and towns in Liguria